Air Chief Marshal Sir Francis Joseph Fogarty,  (16 January 1899 – 12 January 1973) was a senior commander in the Royal Air Force (RAF) during the Second World War and also in the post-war years. During the First World War he served as a pilot in the Royal Flying Corps. He was transferred to the RAF on its creation in 1918 and remained in the service during the inter-war years.

Early life and career
Francis Fogarty was born in Cork, Ireland, on 16 January 1899 and educated at Farranferris College. In 1917 he joined the Royal Flying Corps as an air mechanic. However, he was soon selected for training as a pilot and was commissioned as a second lieutenant. In 1918, Fogarty served as a pilot on No. 98 Squadron, participating in the Battle of Amiens but having to land with engine trouble before he could bomb German airfields or rail lines.

Remaining in the RAF after the war, Fogarty was soon to see active service again, this time in Iraq. He was posted to No. 84 Squadron, where he continued operational flying gaining a mention in despatches and receiving the Distinguished Flying Cross in 1922 for distinguished service. After spending the mid-1920s as a qualified flying instructor at No. 2 Flying Training School, Fogarty returned to Iraq and No. 84 Squadron in 1928 as a flight commander.

The first half of the 1930s saw Fogarty return to Great Britain, initially as the adjutant and qualified flying instructor on No. 601 (County of London) Squadron and then a short time later carrying out the same roles on No. 604 (County of Middlesex) Squadron, which he was instrumental in establishing with the assistance of a warrant officer and 19 airmen. In 1935, he took up his first command appointment as the Officer Commanding No. 84 Squadron back in Iraq before returning to Great Britain in 1937 to serve on the air staff of the recently formed Bomber Command. The following year he was appointed Officer Commanding No. 37 (Bomber) Squadron at Feltwell in Norfolk.

Second World War
Promoted to wing commander in 1938, Fogarty was advanced to group captain in 1940 and, around the same time, appointed Station Commander of RAF Mildenhall, a bomber station.  While at Mildenhall, he appeared in the film "Target for To-night", which won a special Academy Award. On 8 September 1941, he was appointed to lead No. 8 (Bomber) Group within Bomber Command.

In 1943 Fogarty was a member of the RAF mission to Ottawa and in August 1944 he became the Senior Air Staff Officer at the headquarters of No. 4 Group. Towards the end of the war he was promoted to acting air vice marshal and made the Air Officer Administration for the Mediterranean Allied Air Forces.

Post-war
After the war, Fogarty was appointed Air Officer Commanding RAF Italy before becoming Air Officer Administration of the RAF Mediterranean and Middle East command in 1946. The following summer he returned to Great Britain to become the Senior Air Staff Officer at Headquarters Flying Training Command and received a substantive promotion to air vice marshal. From 1949 to 1952 he was Air Officer Commanding-in-Chief the Far East Air Force, dealing with the challenges of the Malayan Emergency and receiving promotion to air marshal in 1950. From 1952 to the end of 1956 he was the RAF's Air Member for Personnel, gaining his final promotion to air chief marshal towards the end of 1953. He retired in January 1957.

In retirement Fogarty became involved in business, as the director of Racal Electronics and also as president of the British Airport Construction and Equipment Association.  In addition he was a deputy president of the Air League and director-general of the English Speaking Union. Fogarty died at his home in Surrey on 12 January 1973.

Notes

External links
aeroconservancy.com – RFC Training Transfer Card to 2nd Lieut. Frances Fogarty

|-

1899 births
1973 deaths
People from Cork (city)
Royal Air Force air marshals
Royal Flying Corps officers
Knights Grand Cross of the Order of the British Empire
Knights Commander of the Order of the Bath
Recipients of the Distinguished Flying Cross (United Kingdom)
Recipients of the Air Force Cross (United Kingdom)